The 98th Fighter-Interceptor Squadron is an inactive United States Air Force unit.  Its last assignment was with the New York Air Defense Sector of Air Defense Command stationed at Suffolk County Air Force Base, New York, where it was inactivated on 30 September 1968.

History

World War II
It was activated in the summer of 1942 as part of III Fighter Command. It became a Curtiss P-40 Warhawk replacement training unit (RTU).  It was inactivated on 1 May 1944 as part of a reorganization of training units.

Air Defense Command
It was reactivated in 1953 as part of Air Defense Command as an air defense squadron, equipped with Northrop F-89D Scorpion interceptors, and assigned to Dover Air Force Base, Delaware with a mission for the air defense of Philadelphia Delaware-Maryland-Virginia region.  On 22 October 1962, before President John F. Kennedy told Americans that missiles were in place in Cuba, the squadron dispersed four of its force, equipped with nuclear tipped missiles to Atlantic City Airport and 4 each to other airports on the east coast at the start of the Cuban Missile Crisis. These planes returned to Dover after the crisis.

The squadron moved to Suffolk County Air Force Base, New York in 1963 to become part of the New York City air defense force. It upgraded in 1959 to the new McDonnell F-101B Voodoo and assigned alongside the F-101B interceptor was the F-101F operational and conversion trainer. The two-seat trainer version was equipped with dual controls, but carried the same armament as the F-101B and were fully combat-capable interceptors.  It was inactivated in September 1968 as part of the drawdown of ADC interceptor bases, and the aircraft were passed along to the Air National Guard.

Lineage
 Constituted 98th Fighter Squadron on 16 July 1942
 Activated on 23 July 1942
 Disbanded on 1 May 1944
 Reconstituted and redesignated 98th Fighter-Interceptor Squadron on 24 October 1955
 Activated on 8 March 1956
 Inactivated on 30 September 1968

Assignments
 III Fighter Command
 337th Fighter Group, 23 July 1942 – 1 May 1944
 Air Defense Command
 4709th Air Defense Wing, 8 March 1956
 4621st Air Defense Wing (later New York Air Defense Sector), 1 October 1956
 4728th Air Defense Group, 8 February 1957
 New York Air Defense Sector, 1 July 1958
 Washington Air Defense Sector, 1 February 1959
 New York Air Defense Sector, 1 July 1961 – 30 September 1968

Stations
 Morris Field, North Carolina, 23 July 1942
 Drew Field, Florida, 7 August 1942
 Sarasota Army Air Field, Florida, 3 January 1943 – 1 May 1944
 Dover Air Force Base, Delaware, 8 March 1956
 Suffolk County Air Force Base, New York, 1 July 1963 – 30 September 1968

Aircraft

 Bell P-39 Airacobra, 1943
 Republic P-43 Lancer, 1942
 Curtiss P-40 Warhawk, 1942–1944
 Northrop F-89D Scorpion, 1956
 Northrop F-89H Scorpion, 1956–1957
 Northrop F-89J Scorpion, 1957–1959
 McDonnell F-101B Voodoo, 1959–1968

See also

References

Notes

Bibliography

 
 
 McMullen, Richard F. (1964) "The Fighter Interceptor Force 1962-1964"  ADC Historical Study No. 27, Air Defense Command, Ent Air Force Base, CO (Confidential, declassified 22 Mar 2000)
 NORAD/CONAD Participation in the Cuban Missile Crisis, Historical Reference Paper No. 8, Directorate of Command History Continental Air Defense Command, Ent AFB, CO, 1 Feb 63 (Top Secret NOFORN declassified 9 March 1996)
 "ADCOM's Fighter Interceptor Squadrons". The Interceptor (January 1979) Aerospace Defense Command, (Volume 21, Number 1)

External links

098
Military units and formations established in 1955
1955 establishments in the United States